Jörgen Olsson (born 8 December 1968) is a Swedish wrestler. He competed in the men's Greco-Roman 100 kg at the 1992 Summer Olympics.

References

1968 births
Living people
Swedish male sport wrestlers
Olympic wrestlers of Sweden
Wrestlers at the 1992 Summer Olympics
Sportspeople from Malmö